Acanthocercus cyanogaster, the blue-bellied ridgeback agama or black-necked tree agama, is a species of lizard in the family Agamidae. It is a small lizard found in Ethiopia, Eritrea, and Somalia.

References

Acanthocercus
Reptiles described in 1835
Taxa named by Eduard Rüppell